Illinois Bell Telephone Company, LLC is the Bell Operating Company serving Illinois. It is owned by AT&T through AT&T Teleholdings, formerly Ameritech.

Their headquarters are at 225 West Randolph St., Chicago, IL. After the 1984 Bell System Divestiture, Illinois Bell became a part of Ameritech, one of the 7 original Regional Bell Operating Companies. The Illinois Bell name continued to be used until January 1993, when Ameritech dropped all of their individual Bell Operating Company names in favor of using their corporate name, Ameritech, for marketing purposes. Illinois Bell started doing business as Ameritech Illinois.

Illinois Bell, in 1971, became the first ever telephone company to offer Call waiting, Three-way calling, Speed Calling, and Call forwarding, all popular local exchange carrier telephone service options to this day.

In 1997, Illinois Bell acquired lines in the Chicago metro area from Central Telephone Company of Illinois, a Sprint company.

In 1998, Ameritech announced intentions to merge with SBC, another former RBOC.  Though the merger wasn't well received at first, it was allowed to occur with some conditions.  The two companies were officially merged as of October 8, 1999.  The Ameritech name continued to be used until 2002, despite the merger.

In 2001, the company started doing business as SBC Ameritech Illinois.

In 2002, SBC dropped the Ameritech name in favor of "SBC" as a national brand. On January 1, 2003, Illinois Bell, for regulatory business, was renamed Illinois Bell Telephone Company d/b/a SBC Illinois. Illinois Bell's trade name was changed once again in 2006, following conclusion of SBC Communications' purchase of AT&T, to Illinois Bell Telephone Company d/b/a AT&T Illinois.

AT&T subsidiaries
Bell System
Telecommunications companies of the United States
Companies based in Chicago
Defunct telecommunications companies of the United States
Telecommunications companies established in 1920 
American companies established in 1920
1920 establishments in Illinois